Shorea gardneri is a species of plant in the family Dipterocarpaceae. It is endemic to Sri Lanka.

Uses
Wood - heavy construction.

Culture
Known as රත් දුන් (rath dun) in Sinhala.

References

gardneri
Endemic flora of Sri Lanka
Trees of Sri Lanka
Critically endangered flora of Asia
Taxonomy articles created by Polbot